Don Luis María Cardinal de Borbón y Vallabriga, Farnesio y Rozas, 14th Count of Chinchón (Cadalso de los Vidrios, 22 May 1777 – Madrid, 19 March 1823), son of a morganatic marriage of Luis de Borbón y Farnesio, Infante of Spain, 13th Count of Chinchón, and wife María Teresa de Vallabriga y Rozas, Español y Drummond, was the 14th Count of Chinchón (1785–1803), Grandee of Spain First Class (4 August 1799), with a coat of arms of Bourbon, and 1st Marqués de San Martín de la Vega.

Life and career
Until Charles III, King of Spain died in 1788, this Borbón offspring was compelled not to use the family name and since 1785 when his father Luis, the king's brother, died, they had to move to the city of Toledo to be educated under the protection of the Archbishop of Toledo Francisco Antonio de Lorenzana y Butrón (León, 22 September 1722 – Rome, 17 April 1804, aged 82), notorious cardinal, historian, and illustrated Spaniard.

He was appointed a Knight of the Illustrious Royal Order of Saint Januarius in 1793, Knight of the Order of Charles III in 1793, Archbishop of Seville (26 May 1799 – 19 May 1814), Archbishop of Toledo (22 December 1799 – 18 March 1823), and Primate of Spain in 1800 and Cardinal-Priest of Santa Maria della Scala (pro hace vice to title) on 20 October 1800. He was not present in Rome at the time and the galero, biretta, and ring were sent to him.

Between 1820 and 1823, he played an important role in Spanish liberal politics, abolishing the Inquisition, although the Inquisition was restored again after the French invasion of Spain in 1823 to restore absolutist policies.

He was made a Knight of the Order of the Golden Fleece on 9 July 1820. He died aged 45, a few weeks before France invaded Spain and restored Ferdinand VII, and some fifteen years after Napoleon's invasion in May 1808.

The Cardinal-Archbishop officiating the ceremonies related to his promotion in the Church was Antonio Sentmanat y Castellá, (Barcelona, 21 April 1734 - Bishop of Ávila, (February 1783 – June 1784) - Patriarch of the West Indies, Antilles, (June 1784 - ), Cardinal-Priest of Santa Maria della Scala, Rome, 30 March 1789 - 14 April 1806, aged 72).

His two sisters were:
 María Teresa de Borbón y Vallabriga, Farnesio y Rozas, 15th Countess of Chinchón, painted several times by Francisco Goya who was married in 1797 to Manuel Godoy y Álvarez de Faria, Prince of the Peace, and had a daughter, Carlota de Godoy, 2nd Duchess of Sueca;
 María Luisa de Borbón y Vallabriga y Rozas Español y Drummond, later Duchess Consort of San Fernando de Quiroga by marriage, a title dating back from 1815, without issue.

References

Gallery

External links 

 Catholic-Hierarchy 

1777 births
1823 deaths
Luis 14
Grandees of Spain
Luis Maria
Knights of the Golden Fleece of Spain
People from the Community of Madrid
19th-century Spanish cardinals
Cardinals created by Pope Pius VII